2006 saw the release of many sequels and prequels in video games, prominently including Grand Theft Auto: Vice City Stories, New Super Mario Bros., Sonic the Hedgehog, and The Legend of Zelda: Twilight Princess, alongside many prominent new releases including Bully, Company of Heroes, Dead Rising, Gears of War, Just Cause, Lost Planet: Extreme Condition, Ōkami, Prey, Resistance: Fall of Man, Saints Row, and Thrillville. Two new home consoles were released during the year: Nintendo's Wii and Sony's PlayStation 3.

The year's best-selling game console was the Nintendo DS, while the year's best-selling video game was New Super Mario Bros. for the DS. The year's most critically acclaimed title was The Legend of Zelda: Twilight Princess for Nintendo's GameCube and Wii consoles.

Events

Business

Critically acclaimed titles
Metacritic (MC) and GameRankings (GR) are aggregators of video game journalism reviews.

Financial performance

Best-selling game consoles

Japan

Europe

North America

Best-selling video games

Japan

United States

United Kingdom

Notable releases

See also
2006 in games

References 

 
Video games by year